The Campeonato Gaúcho Série A2 (Gaucho Championship Series A2) are the football tournament for the Rio Grande do Sul clubs that do not play in the Campeonato Gaúcho Série A1 in Brazil. The competitions are organized by the Rio Grande do Sul Football Federation. Usually, the champions of a division are promoted in the next year to the immediately upper level.

Clubs

2022 Série A2

List of champions

Segunda Divisão de Profissionais

Torneio de Acesso

Primeira Divisão

Divisão de Ascenso

Primeira Divisão

Segunda Divisão

Divisão de Acesso

Segunda Divisão

Divisão de Acesso

Série A2

Notes

Flamengo is the currently SER Caxias.
Ulbra is the currently Canoas SC.
In 2013, Cruzeiro has moved from Porto Alegre to Cachoeirinha.

Titles by team

Teams in bold stills active.

By city

See also
 Campeonato Gaúcho
 Campeonato Gaúcho Série B

References
 Campeonato Gaúcho Second Level at RSSSF
 Campeonato Gaúcho Second Level at Times Brasileiros
 Campeonato Gaúcho Third Level at Times Brasileiros

External links
  FGF Official website